Gounfan  is a small town and commune in the Cercle of Bafoulabé in the Kayes Region of south-western Mali. In the 2009 census the commune had a population of 6,030.

References

External links
 Gounfan at csa-mali.org`

Communes of Kayes Region